Hilarempis is a genus of flies in the family Empididae.

Species
H. adrianus Smith, 1969
H. alpha Smith, 1969
H. antarctica (Walker, 1836)
H. antenniseta Smith, 1969
H. argentella Collin, 1928
H. argentifera Bezzi, 1909
H. argentula Becker, 1919
H. argyrozoma (Philippi, 1865)
H. barbatula Bezzi, 1909
H. basalis Smith, 1969
H. basuta Smith, 1967
H. benhami (Miller, 1913)
H. beta Smith, 1969
H. bicingulata Bezzi, 1909
H. biseriata Collin, 1933
H. brachyrrhyncha Thomson, 1869
H. breviseta Smith, 1967
H. brevistyla Collin, 1928
H. carinata Bezzi, 1909
H. carlieri Smith, 1969
H. cervina (Loew, 1858)
H. cillata Collin, 1933
H. cineracea Collin, 1928
H. commoda Collin, 1933
H. completa (Loew, 1858)
H. cotoxantha Blanchard, 1852
H. crassitarsus Smith, 1969
H. cyanescens (Bezzi, 1904)
H. darglensis Smith, 1969
H. dasytibia Smith, 1969
H. dichropleura Collin, 1928
H. diversimana Collin, 1928
H. dolosa Collin, 1933
H. dumicola (Philippi, 1865)
H. echinata (White, 1916)
H. elegans Bezzi, 1909
H. facilis Collin, 1933
H. famillaris Collin, 1933
H. fasciata Smith, 1969
H. fratercula Smith, 1969
H. fulva (Philippi, 1865)
H. fulva (Walker, 1836)
H. fulvipes (Hutton, 1901)
H. genualis Collin, 1933
H. griseiventris (Philippi, 1865)
H. gubernator Collin, 1933
H. gymnaspis Bezzi, 1909
H. hammondi Smith, 1969
H. heterogastra (Loew, 1858)
H. hilaraeformis (Bezzi, 1904)
H. huttoni Bezzi, 1904
H. idonea Collin, 1933
H. imbeza Smith, 1969
H. immota Collin, 1928
H. inerma Smith, 1969
H. inops Collin, 1933
H. insularis Brèthes, 1924
H. julianus Smith, 1967
H. juri Smith, 1962
H. kaiteriensis (Miller, 1913)
H. languida Collin, 1933
H. laticornis (Bigot, 1888)
H. levicula Collin, 1933
H. longipennis Smith, 1967
H. longistyla Collin, 1928
H. magellanica (Bigot, 1888)
H. maluinensis Enderlein, 1912
H. mediana Collin, 1933
H. mendozana (Brèthes, 1924)
H. minthaphila Collin, 1928
H. moreirai Brèthes, 1924
H. msingi Smith, 1967
H. neptunus Smith, 1969
H. nigra Miller, 1923
H. nigrimana (White, 1916)
H. nigrimanus (White, 1916)
H. nondescripta Smith, 1969
H. notabilis Collin, 1933
H. nudifacies Bezzi, 1905
H. ochrozona Collin, 1928
H. ordinata Collin, 1933
H. otiosa Collin, 1933
H. pallida (Philippi, 1865)
H. pallidifurca (White, 1916)
H. peregrina (White, 1916)
H. polychaeta Bezzi, 1905
H. propinqua Collin, 1933
H. quadrifaria Becker, 1919
H. robusta Smith, 1969
H. rodriguezi Carrera, 1954
H. shunina Smith, 1962
H. sigillata Collin, 1933
H. similipes Collin, 1933
H. simillima Collin, 1928
H. smithii (Hutton, 1901)
H. sordida (Loew, 1858)
H. soror Smith, 1969
H. sp. Smith, 1962
H. spinosa Bezzi, 1909
H. stenostoma Collin, 1933
H. subdita Collin, 1928
H. tenuicornis Smith, 1969
H. tephrodes (Philippi, 1865)
H. tibialis Collin, 1933
H. trichopleura Collin, 1928
H. trochanterata Smith, 1969
H. tucuna Smith, 1962
H. undumeni Smith, 1969
H. uniseta Collin, 1928
H. vanellus (Schiner, 1868)
H. varians (Bigot, 1889)
H. vicina Smith, 1969
H. walkeri Bezzi, 1909
H. xanthocera Bezzi, 1905

References

Empidoidea genera
Hilarempis